The 2020 campaign will be  Lillestrøm 103rd competitive season since the club were founded. During this season the club will be competing in the following competitions: 1. divisjon, Norwegian Cup.

Current squad 

For season transfers, see transfers winter 2019–20 and transfers summer 2020.

Players out on loan

Coaching staff

Administrative staff

Competitions

Club Friendlies

1. divisjon

Results summary

Matches

Norwegian Cup

References

External links
https://www.betexplorer.com/soccer/team/lillestrom/xYWBZlwN/
https://uk.soccerway.com/teams/norway/lillestrom-sportsklubb/1592/matches/
https://www.worldfootball.net/teams/lillestroem-sk/2020/3/

Lillestrøm SK seasons
Lillestrom